Stewart Barlow is an American politician and a Republican member of the Utah House of Representatives representing District 17 since his September 1, 2011, appointment to fill the vacancy created by the resignation of Julie Fisher.

Early life and career
Barlow earned his BS in psychology from the University of Utah and his MD from the Georgetown University School of Medicine. He currently works as a physician and surgeon in Ogden specializing in Otolaryngology and lives in Fruit Heights, Utah with his wife Marie and six children.

Political career
 2014 Barlow won the 2014 general election with 6,973 votes (77.6%) against Democratic nominee Eric Last.
 2012 Barlow was unopposed for the June 26, 2012 Republican primary and won the November 6, 2012 general election with 11,205 votes (70.7%) against Democratic nominee Bonnie Peterson Flint.

Rep. Barlow currently serves on the House Health and Human Services Committee, House Revenue and Taxation Committee, Natural Resources, Agriculture, and Environmental Quality Appropriations Subcommittee.

Barlow also floor sponsored SB0140S01 Home and Community Based Services Amendments.

References

External links
 Official page at the Utah State Legislature
 Campaign site
 Stewart Barlow at Ballotpedia
 Stewart Barlow at the National Institute on Money in State Politics

Place of birth missing (living people)
Year of birth missing (living people)
Living people
Georgetown University School of Medicine alumni
Republican Party members of the Utah House of Representatives
People from Davis County, Utah
University of Utah alumni
Physicians from Utah
American otolaryngologists
21st-century American politicians